The Courage of Silence is a 1917 American silent drama film directed by William P.S. Earle and starring Alice Joyce, Harry T. Morey, and Willie Johnson.

Cast

References

Bibliography
 Donald W. McCaffrey & Christopher P. Jacobs. Guide to the Silent Years of American Cinema. Greenwood Publishing, 1999.

External links
 

1917 films
1917 drama films
1910s English-language films
American silent feature films
Silent American drama films
American black-and-white films
Films directed by William P. S. Earle
Vitagraph Studios films
1910s American films